In psychology, personal distress is an aversive, self-focused emotional reaction (e.g., anxiety, worry, discomfort) to the apprehension or comprehension of another's emotional state or condition. This negative affective state often occurs as a result of emotional contagion when there is confusion between self and other. Unlike empathy, personal distress does not have to be congruent with the other's state, and often leads to a self-oriented, egoistic reaction to reduce it, by withdrawing from the stressor, for example, thereby decreasing the likelihood of prosocial behavior. There is evidence that sympathy and personal distress are subjectively different, have different somatic and physiological correlates, and relate in different ways to prosocial behavior.

Link to risk and resistance

In 1987, one study completed cross-sectional and longitudinal research on a community sample of over 400 adults and their children to examine the link between risk, resistance, and personal distress. Risk factors consisted of negative life events and avoidance coping strategies and, for children, parental emotional and physical distress. Resistance factors were self-confidence, an easygoing disposition, and family support. Outcome criteria were global depression and physical symptoms in adults, and psychological maladjustment and physical health problems in their children.

The survey found that persons who simultaneously experience high risk and low resistance are especially vulnerable to personal distress. The results demonstrated that the risk and resistance variables are significant predictors of concurrent and future psychological and physical distress in adults. In children, the findings demonstrated that parental dysfunction, especially maternal risk factors and family support, are significantly linked to distress. However, these findings also suggested that, in comparison to adults, children may be more resilient to past negative life events affecting their current or future levels of distress. Furthermore, it was noted that children are affected more by mothers' than fathers' functioning, which is congruent with the conventional role of mothers as primary caregivers and with children's relatively stronger maternal attachment relationships.

Development
A study was conducted with a group of children as well as a separate group of adults; both groups were to watch a video. The video was of a negatively emotional news story. While they watched the video their facial expressions were recorded, as well they self reported how they felt after viewing the video. The results found that there is indeed a stark difference between sympathy and personal distress. Markers of sympathy were related to prosocial responses; on the other hand, facial indexes of personal distress were unrelated. For adults it was found that facial sadness and concerned attention tended to be positively related to prosocial tendencies, children on the other hand had a negative relationship between prosocial behaviour and facial personal distress. This displays how there is not only an observable difference between sympathy and personal distress. It can also be seen that there is a difference between how children and adults experience either personal distress or sympathy this is largely related to the level of development that the individual has achieved.

See also
Common coding theory
Mirror neurons

References

Further reading
 Davis, M. H. (1996). Empathy: A Social-Psychological Approach. Westview.
 Hodges, S.D. & Klein, K.J.K. (2001). Regulating the costs of empathy: the price of being human. Journal of Socio-Economics, 30, 437–452.
 Eisenberg, N., & Strayer, J. (1987). Empathy and its Development. Cambridge: Cambridge University Press.
 Eisenberg, N., Fabes, R.A., Miller, P.A., Fultz, J., Shell, R., Mathy, R.M., & Reno, R.R. (1989). Relation of sympathy and personal distress to prosocial behavior: A multimethod study. Journal of Personality and Social Psychology, 57(1), 55–66.

External links
 Mirrored emotion by Jean Decety from the University of Chicago.

Emotion
Interpersonal relationships